Mission is a city in Johnson County, Kansas, United States, and part of the Kansas City Metropolitan Area.  As of the 2020 census, the population of the city was 9,954.

History
An Indian mission was established in 1829 at the town's site, hence the name of the later settlement.

Today, the town is broken into lots, with small houses of different designs on large lots.

Geography
Mission is located at  (39.025572, -94.656056).

Demographics

2010 census
As of the census of 2010, there were 9,323 people, 5,000 households, and 2,130 families living in the city. The racial makeup of the city was 84.6% White, 5.5% African American, 0.4% Native American, 3.9% Asian, 2.6% from other races, and 3.0% from two or more races. Hispanic or Latino of any race were 8.2% of the population.

There were 5,000 households, of which 18.3% had children under the age of 18 living with them, 31.0% were married couples living together, 8.6% had a female householder with no husband present, 3.0% had a male householder with no wife present, and 57.4% were non-families. 46.8% of all households were made up of individuals, and 10% had someone living alone who was 65 years of age or older. The average household size was 1.86 and the average family size was 2.69.

The median age in the city was 35.2 years. 16.1% of residents were under the age of 18; 10% were between the ages of 18 and 24; 36.6% were from 25 to 44; 23.9% were from 45 to 64; and 13.4% were 65 years of age or older. The gender makeup of the city was 47.5% male and 52.5% female.

2000 census
As of the census of 2000, there were 9,727 people, 5,119 households, and 2,226 families living in the city. The racial makeup of the city was 88.95% White, 3.78% African American, 0.33% Native American, 2.76% Asian, 0.01% Pacific Islander, 2.03% from other races, and 2.15% from two or more races. Hispanic or Latino of any race were 4.91% of the population. 25.6% were of German, 13.5% English, 12.9% Irish and 7.2% American ancestry according to Census 2000.

There were 5,119 households, out of which 16.7% had children under the age of 18 living with them, 33.1% were married couples living together, 8.1% had a female householder with no husband present, and 56.5% were non-families. 45.6% of all households were made up of individuals, and 8.5% had someone living alone who was 65 years of age or older. The average household size was 1.88 and the average family size was 2.70.

In the city, the population was spread out, with 16.1% under the age of 18, 12.3% from 18 to 24, 37.1% from 25 to 44, 19.6% from 45 to 64, and 14.9% who were 65 years of age or older. The median age was 35 years. For every 100 females, there were 88.8 males. For every 100 females age 18 and over, there were 86.0 males.

As of 2000 the median income for a household was $42,298, and the median income for a family was $59,328. Males had a median income of $37,544 versus $30,647 for females. The per capita income for the city was $27,870. About 3.6% of families and 6.6% of the population were below the poverty line, including 5.7% of those under age 18 and 2.3% of those age 65 or over.

Economy
The agricultural and transport company Seaboard Corporation has corporate offices located just to the west of Mission in the city of Merriam.  The United States Postal Service lumps many addresses in the Johnson County, KS suburbs under the combined name of "Shawnee Mission, Kansas", although this refers to a historical mission, Shawnee Methodist Mission. Shawnee is considerably larger than Mission and the postal name of Shawnee Mission applies to a far larger area and population than the combined total of just those two incorporated cities.  The postal address of Seaboard's offices is "Shawnee Mission".

Radio station clusters owned by Cumulus Media and Entercom have their studios in Mission.

Government
The City of Mission offers several assistance programs to help residents maintain the exteriors of their homes. These programs include Mission Possible, an effort to help elderly and disabled individuals remove dilapidated structures, physical barriers, and make basic repairs to their homes and property. The city also provides free paint and primer to low income residents to maintain the aesthetics of their homes.

Mission is a member of the national Mayors Climate Protection Agreement, an effort encouraging cities to reduce greenhouse emissions.

Libraries
The Johnson County Library serves the residents of Johnson County, KS, including Mission, KS.  It has thirteen locations county wide.  JCL's Antioch Road location in Merriam, KS is just to the west and the Cedar Roe location in Roeland Park, Kansas is just to the north.  However, the library does not have a location in Mission proper.

Notable people
Notable individuals who were born in and/or have lived in Mission include:
 Bart Evans (1947– ), polo player
 Earl Eugene O'Connor (1922–1998), U.S. federal judge
 James B. Pearson (1920–2009), U.S. Senator from Kansas
 Michael Sull (1949– ), calligrapher
 Grant Wahl (1974–2022), sports journalist

References

Further reading

 The City of Mission, Kansas: 50 Years of Progress'''; Joe Vaughan Associates; 2003.
 History of Mission & Northeast Johnson County'''; Elizabeth Brooks; 1992.

External links
 City of Mission, KS
 Mission - Directory of Public Officials
 Kansas City metro area map, KDOT

Cities in Kansas
Cities in Johnson County, Kansas
Cities in Kansas City metropolitan area